Frederic Peter Andre Simon (born 14 October 1995) is an English former first-class cricketer.

Freddie was born at Cheltenham in October 1995. He was educated at the St Edward's School, Oxford before going up to Durham University. While studying at Durham, he made a single appearance in first-class cricket for Durham MCCU against Essex at Chelmsford in 2017. Batting once in the match, he was dismissed for a single run in the Durham MCCU first innings by Ravi Bopara, while with his right-arm medium-fast bowling he took 2 wickets in the Essex first innings, dismissing Adam Wheater and Ryan ten Doeschate, while in their second innings he dismissed Varun Chopra to take match figures of 3 for 128.

References

External links

1995 births
Living people
People from Cheltenham
People educated at St Edward's School, Oxford
Alumni of Durham University
English cricketers
Durham MCCU cricketers